The Japanese village Minamimaki, Nagano held a mayoral election on November 11, 2007. Yukihiko Kikuchi beat the incumbent mayor Yoshito Nakajima.

Candidates 

 Yoshito Nakajima, incumbent mayor of Minamimaki.
 Yukihiko Kikuchi, farmer and former city assembly members for the Japanese Communist Party (JCP).

Issues 
The main issue was the proposed merger of the village with neighboring Kawakami. In a referendum earlier this year 87% voted not to merger. Incumbent mayor Yoshito Nakajima supported a merger while Yukihiko Kikuchi of the JCP was against it. Kikuchi also called for a "agriculture revitalization" and criticized what he called "undemocratic policies" of the incumbent mayor.

Results 

Yukihiko Kikuchi won the election with 430 more votes than Yoshito Nakajima.

References 
 Results from JanJan 
 Japan Press coverage

2007 elections in Japan
Mayoral elections in Japan
November 2007 events in Japan
Minamimaki, Nagano